Romántico may refer to:

Music
 El Romántico, album by José Manuel Calderón (musician) 1974
 Romántico (José José album), 1981
 Romántico, a compilation album by Gilberto Santa Rosa 2001 
 Romantico (Kamikazee album), 2012

Other
 Romántico (film), a 2005 documentary type film directed by Mark Becker
 Romántico (horse) (1935–1957), South American thoroughbred